Billlie (stylized as Bi11lie or Billlǃə) is a South Korean girl group formed by Mystic Story. Billlie debuted on November 10, 2021, with the extended play (EP) The Billage of Perception: Chapter One. The group originally consisted of six members: Moon Sua, Suhyeon, Haram, Tsuki, Siyoon and Haruna. A seventh member, Sheon, later joined the group.

Name
The name Billlie is spelled with three Ls due to the fact that the name can be broken down into 'Bi' (Korean word for rain), '11''', and 'lie' — Bi11lie. The number '11' came from their group's legend; "When the 11th bell rings in the middle of a purple rain, something strange happens", where the members lie about what happened in order to keep the event a secret. The name also reflects their "B-sides, the inner-self that everyone has inside them", which they express in hope to empathize with the audience.

Career
Pre-debut
The members of Billlie were known as Mystic Rookies — a rookie development program under Mystic Story. On September 14, Mystic Story announced plans to debut Mystic rookies in November 2021. On October 11, It was revealed that the group would be called 'Billlie'.

Prior to debut, Moon Sua was a YG Entertainment trainee for 10 years. She participated in the music competition program Unpretty Rapstar 2 finishing as the third runner-up. Suhyeon participated in the Mnet survival program Produce 101 placing 69th and eliminated in the fifth episode. She also participated in the JTBC survival program Mix Nine and starred in the web drama A-Teen in 2018, and its 2019 sequel A-Teen 2. Haram and Tsuki are former SM Entertainment trainees. Additionally, Tsuki worked as a model for the magazine Popteen and released the single "Magic" with the modeling group MAGICOUR in 2020. Sheon participated in the Mnet survival program Girls Planet 999, and was eliminated in the final episode placing tenth. Siyoon participated in the talent show K-pop Star 5 and also worked as a model for the magazine Popteen.

2021–present: Debut with The Billage of Perception: Chapter One, "Snowy Night", and The Collective Soul and Unconscious: Chapter One
On October 28, it was announced that their debut EP The Billage of Perception: Chapter One would be released on November 10. A fan song titled "Flowerld", which was also included on the EP, was also released on the same day.

On November 10, their debut EP The Billage of Perception: Chapter One was released featuring lead single "Ring X Ring" and five B-side tracks.

On November 19, it was announced that Kim Su-yeon, who had participated in Girls Planet 999, would join the group under the stage name Sheon (션) as the seventh member, and would officially join the group for their next album. On November 27, Sheon made a surprise appearance performing title track "Ring X Ring" along with the other members on South Korean music show Show! Music Core, marking her first appearance with the group.

On December 14, the group released their first digital single album The Collective Soul and Unconscious: Snowy Night with "Snowy Night" as the lead single. The single is the group's first release to feature member Sheon.

On February 11, 2022, it was announced that Billlie would be releasing their second EP The Collective Soul And Unconscious: Chapter One, featuring lead single "GingaMingaYo (The Strange World)" on February 23. On March 1, the group released their first soundtrack album The Collective Soul and Unconscious: Chapter One Original Soundtrack from "What Is Your B?".

On August 8, 2022, it was announced the group would be releasing a direct sequel to their first EP. On August 16, it was announced that their third EP The Billage of Perception: Chapter Two'', featuring lead single "Ring Ma Bell (What a Wonderful World)", would be released on August 31.

Members
 Moon Sua
 Suhyeon
 Haram
 Tsuki
 Sheon
 Siyoon
 Haruna

Timeline

Discography

Extended plays

Single albums

Soundtrack albums

Singles

Videography

Music video

Awards and nominations

Notes

References

2021 establishments in South Korea
Musical groups from Seoul
K-pop music groups
Musical groups established in 2021
South Korean dance music groups
South Korean girl groups
Mystic Entertainment artists